Franske Islands, ; meaning 'French Islands', is a group of uninhabited islands of the Greenland Sea, Greenland.  Administratively the islands belong to the Northeast Greenland National Park.

Geography
The Franske Islands lie off Jokel Bay, northeastern Greenland, just east of Schnauder Island and the Achton Friis Islands , between the Norske Islands to the north and the Danske Islands to the south. 

There are seven large islands in the group, as well as numerous smaller islands and islets. The Duke of Orléans Arctic Expedition had given the name "Iles Françaises"' to a group further south in 1905. A few years later the Denmark Expedition transferred the name to the northernmost islands that the French expedition could have explored and named the group south of the Pariserøerne "Danske Islands".

See also
List of islands of Greenland

References

Uninhabited islands of Greenland